John Roxburgh Smith (November 10, 1936 – December 6, 2018), listed in some directories as John Roxborough Smith, was a Canadian politician, who represented the electoral district of Hamilton Mountain in the Legislative Assembly of Ontario from 1967 to 1977 as a Progressive Conservative member.

Politics
Smith was born in London, Ontario in 1939. He was an alderman for Hamilton, Ontario City Council in the early 1960s.

In the 1967 provincial election, he ran as the Progressive Conservative candidate in the new riding of Hamilton Mountain. He defeated NDP candidate John Dowling by 1,085 votes. He was re-elected in 1971 and 1975. In the 1977 he was defeated by NDP challenger Brian Charlton by 308 votes.

In October 1975, he was appointed as Minister of Correctional Services. In February 1977 he was appointed as Minister of Government Services but served only four months when he was defeated by Charlton in June, 1977.

Later life
As of 2015, Smith was a minister and archdeacon at St. George's Church in Hamilton. He died in 2018 at the age of 82 in Hamilton, Ontario.

References

External links 
 

1936 births
2018 deaths
Hamilton, Ontario city councillors
Members of the Executive Council of Ontario
Politicians from London, Ontario
Progressive Conservative Party of Ontario MPPs